Marguerite M. Kleven (born March 28, 1931) is a retired American politician who served in the South Dakota Senate from 1995 to 2004. She entered office replacing her husband, Leslie J. Kleven, following his death in office in 1995. Kleven was succeeded by Kenneth McNenny in 2004.

References

1931 births
Living people
People from Butte County, South Dakota
Businesspeople from South Dakota
Women state legislators in South Dakota
Republican Party South Dakota state senators
20th-century American politicians
20th-century American women politicians
21st-century American politicians
21st-century American women politicians
People from Sturgis, South Dakota